Stephen Eaton (1737–1806), FRS was Archdeacon of Middlesex   from 1781 until his death.

Eaton was born in Deene; educated at Eton and Merton College, Oxford;  and ordained deacon in 1761, and priest in 1763. After a curacy in Holborn he served incumbencies in  Thorley, Northolt and Soho.

He died on 14 February 1806.

Notes

1737 births
People from North Northamptonshire
People educated at Eton College
Alumni of Merton College, Oxford
Archdeacons of Middlesex
Fellows of the Royal Society
1806 deaths